Zutphen is a city and municipality located in the province of Gelderland, Netherlands. It lies some 30 km northeast of Arnhem, on the eastern bank of the river Ijssel at the point where it is joined by the Berkel. First mentioned in the 11th century, the place-name appears to mean "south fen" ( in modern Dutch). In 2005, the municipality of Zutphen was merged with the municipality of Warnsveld, retaining its name.

History

In about 300 AD, a Germanic settlement was the first permanent town on a complex of the low river dunes. Whereas many such settlements were abandoned in the early Middle Ages, Zutphen, on its strategic confluence of IJssel and Berkel, stayed. After the incorporation of the IJssel lands in Charlemagne's Francia, Zutphen became a local centre of governance under the Count of Zutphen. The Normans raided and ravaged it in 882. Afterwards, a circular fortress was built to protect the budding town against Viking attacks.

In the eleventh century, Zutphen was a royal residence for a number of years; a pfalz was built, together with a large chapter church, the predecessor of the present St. Walburgis. The counts of Zutphen acquired a lot of power until the line of counts became extinct in the twelfth century. After the death of her father and her brother, Ermengarde, the heiress of Zutphen married the count of Guelders; her son Henry I, Count of Guelders was the first to wear both titles.

The settlement received town rights between 1191 and 1196, making it one of the oldest towns in the country. This allowed it to self govern and have a judicial court. Only Utrecht, and Deventer preceded it in receiving town rights. Zutphen, in turn, became the mother town of several other towns in Guelders, such as Arnhem, Doetinchem, Doesburg, Lochem, Harderwijk, Venlo and Emmerich. It also became part of the Hanseatic League, a group of towns with great wealth; this league was the economic centre in that part of Europe.

During the 12th century, coins were minted in Zutphen by the Counts of Guelders and Zutphen: Henry I (–1181) and Otto I (1182–1207). Although the city had minting rights for a few centuries, this was only actively used during four periods: 1478–1480, 1582–1583, 1604–1605 and 1687–1692.

The largest and oldest church of the city is the St. Walburgis (Saint Walpurga) church, which originally dates from the eleventh century. The present Gothic building contains monuments of the former counts of Zutphen, a fourteenth-century candelabrum, an elaborate copper font (1527), and a monument to the Van Heeckeren family (1700). The chapter-house's library contains a pre-Reformation collection, including some valuable manuscripts and incunabula. It is considered one of only five remaining medieval libraries in Europe (in England and Italy). This chained library's books are still chained to their ancient wooden desk – a custom from centuries ago, when the "public library" used chains to prevent theft.

Having been fortified, the town withstood several sieges, especially during the Eighty Years' War, the most celebrated fight under its walls being the Battle of Zutphen in September 1586 when Sir Philip Sidney was mortally wounded. Taken by the Spanish in 1587 by the treachery of the English commander Rowland York, Zutphen was recovered by Maurice, Prince of Orange, in the 1591 siege, and except for two short periods, one in 1672 and the other during the French Revolutionary Wars, it has since then remained a part of the Netherlands. Its fortifications were dismantled in 1874. In World War II, the town was bombed several times by the allied forces because the bridge over the IJssel was vital to support the German troops at Arnhem after the Operation Market Garden. After two weeks of battle, the town was liberated on 14 April 1945. After the war, a renovation program started. Nowadays, Zutphen has one of the best-preserved medieval town centres of northwestern Europe, including the remains of the medieval town wall and a few hundred buildings dating from the 13th, 14th and 15th centuries.

Modern city

The old center survived the Second World War almost in its entirety. The city center includes many monumental buildings dating back to the 14th and 15th centuries, and some even date back to the 13th century, such as a retirement home area. There are also remains of the old town walls in several places.

Today, Zutphen is a modern small city. The urban area, which includes the village of Warnsveld, has about 51,000 inhabitants. Food shops are open from 8:30; Other stores are open from 9:30 to 18:00 on weekdays, on Friday evening until 21:00 and on Saturday until 17:00. Some stores open earlier, and the larger supermarkets usually stay open until 22:00.

Culture

Interesting buildings and squares 
Because Zutphen contains many historical buildings with a tower, Zutphen is often called the tower city. Because there are almost no modern high-rise buildings in the city centre, the historical tower spires are very visible and form the skyline of Zutphen. The title of tower city is often used in advertising to draw tourists to Zutphen.

Religious architecture 
The Walburgis church was built as a Roman collegiate church around 1050. After that, it was redecorated, rebuilt and remodelled on several occasions. There are six bells in the tower, which are still run by hand.

Since 1561 a library called the Librije was added to the church. It was founded as a public library for the rich citizens of Zutphen. The library contains an important collection of 15th- to 17th-century books.

The Broederen (brothers) church is a largely early 14th-century monastery church of the Dominican order. Since 1983 the church has been used as the city's public library, and it has recently been extensively restored. On top of the church, a roof turret from 1771 contains the porter's bell. This bell is still rung every day between 9:50 and 22:00 the time at which, until 1853, the city gates would be closed.

The Nieuwstads (new city) church houses the Catholic community. It was founded as a parish church around 1250. Since then, it has been expanded, remodelled and restored many times. It has four original medieval bells.

Civic architecture 
The Drogenaps tower was built between 1444 and 1446 as a city gate. In 1465 the entrance was bricked up, after which it became known as a tower instead of a gate. City musician Tonis Drogenap lived there around 1555, and the tower's current name is derived from him. From 1888 to 1927, the tower was used as a water tower.

The Wijnhuis (Winery) Tower was built between 1618 and 1642 by the city master builder Emond Hellenraet, influenced by Hendrick de Keyser. In 1644 the brothers Pieter and François Hemony made the world's first correctly-tuned carillon for this tower. During the summer months, carillon concerts are regularly held.

The Bourgonje tower was a defensive turret built in 1457. It was built during the Gelderland-Burgundian war. In this tower, the Dutch theologian and philosopher Johannes Florentius Martinet wrote his Katechismus der Natuur (Catechism of Nature).

The Berkel gate is part of the city wall on the east side of the medieval city. This gate over the river Berkel connected the old and new cities. It was built in 1320. It also had a western counterpart, but that gate was demolished in 1772.

Other interesting sights in Zutphen 
The city of Zutphen had almost 400 national monuments and over 500 local monuments. It is one of the most important and well-preserved historical city centers in the Netherlands. Zutphen has a great many medieval, especially 14th-century, houses. These houses, often with ornamental facades, can be spotted throughout the city center.

When walking along with the old city market, you will see several large 18th- and 19th-century buildings that used to belong to well-to-do citizens and merchants.

Regional center

Juridical center
Zutphen, although a relatively small town, is a center for Dutch legal institutions. Zutphen houses one of the 13 Dutch courts, as well as the national training institution for judges and public prosecutors (SSR), the national police academy for senior police investigators, three prisons, and a large number of lawyers. The early emergence of Zutphen in the Middle Ages as the main town of a county explains its prominent position in the juridical system.

Besides a 'normal' prison, the JPC de Sprengen penitentiary facility for boys is also located in Zutphen. There are several buildings: new institutions replacing the old facilities, but the old prisons remained open after the completion of the new facilities. Only the old prison called Lunette did not meet today's standards and closed in 2008.

Medical centre
Located in Zutphen is the "Spittaal", location of the Gelre Ziekenhuizen (Gelre Hospitals) group. This regular hospital offers all common specialties (no cardio-thoracic or neurosurgery) and a 24/7 emergency department. It is located in the southeastern part of the town, in the district of Leesten. A sizable number of practitioners of alternative medicine are located in Zutphen.

Educational centre
Zutphen is home to several well-known schools for secondary education on all levels. These include the "Het Stedelijk" (Dalton plan education and bilingual education), "Baudartius College", "Vrije School Zutphen", (a "Vrije School" being a Waldorf School), and "Isendoorn College" (with bilingual education, located in Warnsveld). Students from a wide area around Zutphen learn at these schools.

Transport

Rail 
Zutphen railway station is an important regional railway centre. The main electrified lines, to Deventer and Zwolle in the north, and to Arnhem and Nijmegen in the south, are run by the national railway company Nederlandse Spoorwegen (NS). The secondary lines to Winterswijk and Apeldoorn are operated by Arriva. The secondary line to Hengelo is operated by Blauwnet (a division of Syntus). The regional rail service is run by a special subsidiary of the NS. All secondary lines run diesel trains. Zutphen's old station building (1863), upgraded in 1875, was partly destroyed during World War II. In the early 1950s a modern new station was built, a typical post-war building with concrete as its main material.
However, in October 2007, the station building was designated as a State Monument. In 2006 and 2007, the railway station area was completely renovated: a new bus terminal and an underground bicycle parking lot were constructed, and the main road leading from the railway station to the town centre was turned into a road for pedestrians and cyclists only.

Road
Zutphen lies 10 kilometers south of the A1 motorway, which can be entered where it passes Deventer. From there the A1 leads East to Hengelo and West past Apeldoorn to Amsterdam. Main roads are the N348 (Arnhem to Zutphen, Deventer and Ommen), N314 (Zutphen to Doetinchem), N319 (Zutphen to Vorden and Winterswijk), N345 (Zutphen to Lochem and Hengelo), N826 (Zutphen to Almen and Laren).

Bus
Almost all buses in and around Zutphen are Arriva. There are three internal city bus lines, and regional lines to Doetinchem, Deventer, Almen-Laren and Vorden. The bus lines towards Apeldoorn and Dieren were canceled in the past; these towns and the destinations in between can now only be reached by car or by train.

Sister cities

Zutphen is twinned with:

Delegations including the mayors of the cities visit each other, and developmental aid programs are in place with Satu Mare, Tartu and Villa Sandino.

Notable residents

Public thinking & Public Service 
 Gerard Zerbolt of Zutphen (1367–1398) a mystical writer and early member of the Brethren of the Common Life
 Johannes Mensing (1477–1547) a German Dominican theologian and controversialist, an opponent of Martin Luther
 Pieter and François Hemony (c. 1609–1667 and 1619–1680), bell founders, who built the world's first tuned carillon, installed in Zutphen's Wijnhuistoren tower in 1644
 Arnold van Keppel, 1st Earl of Albemarle (1670–1718) right-hand man of William III of Orange 
 Judith van Dorth (1747 in Warnsveld – 1799) an orangist and aristocrat, executed for treason
 John Andrew Stedman (1778–1833) a general in the Dutch army during the Napoleonic Wars
 Jacob van Heeckeren tot Enghuizen (1792–1884) a Dutch diplomat
 Herman Hendrik Baanders (1849–1905) architect who was primarily active in Amsterdam
 Richard Constant Boer (1863 in Warnsveld - 1929) a Dutch linguist specializing in Old Norse. 
 Gijsbert Weijer Jan Bruins (1884–1948) executive director IMF 1946/48, Royal commissioner of the Netherlands Bank 1926–1946
 Hendrik Mulderije (1896–1970), politician, Minister of Justice 
 Joop Westerweel (1899–1944), Dutch World War II resistance leader, the head of the Westerweel Group
 Robert van Gulik (1910–1967) an orientalist, diplomat, and writer
 Dr. Gerrit Kastein (1910–1943) a Dutch communist, neurologist and resistance fighter in WWII
 Jan Christiaan Lindeman (1921-2007), botanist
 Theo Hendriks (1928 - 2015), politician (House of Representatives (Netherlands)
 Mart Bax born 1937, emeritus and professor in political anthropology at the Vrije Universiteit
 Henk Tennekes (1950-2020), toxicologist
 Paul de Krom (born 1953), politician, Minister in the First Rutte cabinet
 Kees Luesink (1953-2014), politician and Mayor of Doesburg
 Ap Dijksterhuis (born 1968), social psychologist at Radboud University Nijmegen

The Arts 
 Catharina van Rees (1831-1915) an author, editor and composer
 Jan Brandts Buys (1868–1933) a Dutch-Austrian classical composer 
 Margo Scharten-Antink (1869–1957) a Dutch poet
 Mommie Schwarz (1876–1942 in Auschwitz) a Dutch Jewish painter and graphic artist
 Jo Spier (1900–1978) artist and illustrator
 Marlous Fluitsma (born 1946) a Dutch film and TV actress
 Ellen ten Damme (born 1967 in Warnsveld) a Dutch actress, singer-songwriter and multi-instrumentalist
 Mark van Eeuwen (born 1976 in Warnsveld) a Dutch actor
 Bas Kosters (born 1977) a Dutch fashion designer, known for his colourful designs

Sport 
 Lambertus Doedes (1878–1955) a sailor, competed at the 1928 Summer Olympics
 Dolf van der Scheer (1909–1966) a speed skater, competed in the 1936 Winter Olympics
 Jos Alberts born 1960, a cyclist
 Hans Kelderman (born 1966) a rower
 Mitchell van der Gaag (born 1971) a retired footballer with 431 club caps and a football manager 
 Josephus Schenk (born 1980) a professional darts player 
 Henri Schoeman (judoka) born 1983, judoka
 Jan Werle (born 1984 in Warnsveld) a chess grandmaster and student civil lawyer
 Mirte Roelvink (born 1985) footballer in the Netherlands women's national football team
 Johnatan Opoku born 1990, a footballer

Gallery

References

External links 

 Official Website
 Photo Album of Zutphen (in Dutch only)
 Hanseatic Cities in the Netherlands
 Official tourism office Website

 
Cities in the Netherlands
Municipalities of Gelderland
Populated places in Gelderland
Members of the Hanseatic League
Achterhoek
Populated places established in the 1st millennium